Sponsored by Democratic Party Congressional representative for California John E. Raker, the Irrigation Districts and Farm Loans Act, also known as the Raker Act, required that a court of competent jurisdiction confirm contracts between the Secretary of the Interior and locally formed irrigation districts to ensure that the districts had the necessary authority before the contracts became binding.  It was proposed and discussed in Washington, D.C. from March 4, 1921, to March 4, 1923, during the Sixty-seventh United States Congress meeting of the legislative branch of the United States federal government, consisting of the United States Senate and the United States House of Representatives, during the first two years of Warren Harding's presidency.  The Act became law on May 15, 1922.

See also
 Newlands Reclamation Act
 Pittman Underground Water Act

References

United States federal agriculture legislation